Garden of the Purple Dragon is a children's fantasy novel by Carole Wilkinson, published in September 2005 by Macmillan Publishers. It is the second in the Dragonkeeper series and the predecessor to Dragon Moon. It is set in ancient China, during the Han Dynasty, and continues the story of Ping, slave girl turned dragonkeeper.

Plot
Ping is living on the top of Tai Shan mountain trying to raise Kai, Danzi's son. Ping learns that Kai can shape-change and turns into firstly a soup ladle. They are living happily until one day, their goat is found with its throat slit. Hua also returns to Ping on a red phoenix's back. Ping and Kai flee but they run into the necromancer. After Hua uses his newfound powers to hold off the necromancer while Ping and Kai escape, Ping, Kai and Hua are later captured by guards and taken to Liu Che, Emperor of China, and Ping's 'friend' who drops all charges against them. Ping stays in the palace and meets Princess Yangxin and the two become friends, and the Princess begins to teach Ping how to read and write, since she is unable to do so already. Ping eventually convinces the Emperor to search for any other Dragon Keepers, as she hopes to find her family. She, Kai and Dong Fang Suo (Fatso as Kai had begun to call him) go to a village in search of the next Dragon Keeper. But they do not find Ping's family there, instead, a boy named Jun is taken to be instructed as a Dragonkeeper. Ping becomes jealous when Kai seems to prefer Jun over her. During the journey back to the palace, Ping is nearly killed in an accident and left for dead, but she survives and finds her real family. After staying with them for a short time, she decides to return to the palace for Kai. However the Necromancer is there, bleeding Kai. They duel and Ping, without Kai, escapes to warn the Emperor who reveals he is in league with the Necromancer. She is stripped of her position as Imperial Dragonkeeper and taken off to be sacrificed. During the sacrifice, Dong Fang Suo, Jun, Hua and Kai come to her aid and they defeat the necromancer though Dong Fang Suo is sadly killed (who says it was the Emperor who ordered him and the necromancer to make the accident that almost killed Ping before he dies). While Jun takes his body away, Ping and Kai (Ping had let Hua go free with other rats) escape with Princess Yangxin, who asks them to go with her to the Duke's at the Kunlun Mountains, and the two agree, hoping to find a place to live in safety from the Empire.

Major characters
Ping 萍 - Formerly a slave girl, around the age of twelve although she is now the Imperial Dragon Keeper of Long Kai Duan. She is unsure of her position as Dragon Keeper, but tries the best she can.
Hua - A pet rat of Ping. In 'Dragon Keeper' he was fatally wounded and Ping sent him with Danzi to the Isle of Blest. He was sent back to Ping on the back of a red phoenix by Danzi in 'Garden of the Purple Dragon'. He has developed the power to shoot flaming spit balls from his mouth and his fur and eyes have become blue.
Long Danzi 龍膽子 - An old and wise green dragon, father of Kai and formerly in the care of Ping. He is currently at the Isle of Blest but continues to guide and advise Ping through dreams. 
Long Kai Duan 龍開端 - A young purple dragon, son of Long Danzi. He is a young dragon, recently born and lacks maturity. He is trying to perfect his shapechanging ability.
"The Necromancer" - An evil necromancer who is in search of Kai and Danzi in hope to sell their body parts for gold. Forms allegiance with Liu Che to help with his search for immortality and dies when he is poisoned through the livers he implants in himself to increase his abilities.
Liu Che - The seventh emperor of the Han kingdom. He is desperately searching for eternal youth so he can rule his kingdom for the good of all, but this gradually becomes an obsession to live forever.
Princess Yangxin - The sister of Liu Che. Formerly betrothed to Duke of Yan until the Duke found she loved another, disgracing the Imperial family and has been sent back to China. She has a mortal fear of rats because after the Duke of Yan killed her lover, he hung the man up before her and forced her to watch everyday as rats devoured him. Her palace haunt is the spiral bamboo pavilion.
Dong Fang Suo - The imperial magician. He initially attempts to kill Ping under the Emperors command but later helps her in the defeat of the necromancer.
Jun- A boy that Dong Fang Suo and Ping meets when searching for the Yu family. He is said to have the Dragon Keeping skills claimed by his parents but later, he reveals himself to be a false Dragon Keeper.
Duke of Yan - The Duke who killed the guard who Princess Yangxin secretly loved, was hung up dead on the city walls of Chang 'an and forced her to watch rats devouring him every single day. Giving her a major phobia of rats so when she saw Hua for the first time she was ill for several days. Later, he took Princess Yangxin back to his palace and offered her a chance to become his wife once more.
Master Lan - The man who buys Ping off her mother, knowing Ping is a possible dragon keeper but lies to her mother instead and says she will be a lady’s maid and be paid a huge fortune which can be sent to her. Instead he takes her to his castle, uses Ping as a slave for himself and makes her do barn work and feed the dragons Danzi another dragon. When the other dragon dies, he turns it into something called “dragon pickle” and ends up poisoning Liu Che’s father (The former emperor) and tells the guards Ping is a “sorceress”.

Awards
2006 West Australian Young Book Readers Awards - Winner
2006 Queensland Premier's Literary Awards - Shortlisted
2006 Kids Own Australian Literary Awards (KOALA) - Shortlisted
2006 COOL (Canberra's Own Outstanding List) Award - Shortlisted

2005 novels
Dragonkeeper books
2005 children's books